Jeffry Armbruster is an Ohio politician. He served two terms as the mayor of North Ridgeville, Ohio and represented the 13th district in the Ohio Senate from 1999 to 2006. He is the safety service director of North Ridgeville.

Biography

Early life and education
Armbruster graduated from Millikin University in 1969.

References

Year of birth missing (living people)
Living people
Millikin University alumni
Republican Party Ohio state senators
21st-century American politicians
People from North Ridgeville, Ohio
Mayors of places in Ohio